Kruppel like factor 16 is a protein that in humans is encoded by the KLF16 gene.

References

Further reading